Temnostoma excentrica  (Harris, 1841 ), the Black-spotted Falsehorn , is a common species of syrphid fly observed throughout the United States and Canada. Hoverflies can remain nearly motionless in flight. The adults are also known as flower flies for they are commonly found on flowers, from which they get both energy-giving nectar and protein-rich pollen. Temnostoma adults are strong wasp mimics. The larvae burrow in moist decayed wood.

Distribution
Canada, Northern United States.

References

Eristalinae
Insects described in 1841
Diptera of North America